Lee Jin-Ho  (born 3 September 1984) is a former South Korean football player.

Club career statistics

Honours

Club
Ulsan Hyundai
K-League: 2005

References

1984 births
Living people
Sportspeople from Ulsan
Association football forwards
South Korean footballers
Ulsan Hyundai FC players
Pohang Steelers players
Gimcheon Sangmu FC players
Daegu FC players
Jeju United FC players
Gwangju FC players
Lee Jin-ho
Korea National League players
K League 1 players
K League 2 players
Expatriate footballers in Thailand
South Korean expatriate footballers
South Korean expatriate sportspeople in Thailand
21st-century South Korean people